Felipe "Waxx" Delgado (born April 6, 1969) is an American DJ, songwriter and producer from the south side of Chicago, Illinois later based in Phoenix, Arizona. He is primarily known for his discovery of House Music/R&B Diva, CeCe Peniston, also a founder and pioneer of Arizona Hip Hop/R&B and Dance, and his collaborative works with friend, also from Chicago, fellow producer Rodney K. Jackson. In 1990, he founded the Wax Museum Productions (originally Wax Museum Music BMI), and co-founded Heat City Records with Jackson in 1995. In 2013 Delgado was contacted by TV One, Unsung (TV series) executives to co-star in an hour documentary alongside Peniston and others, about her legendary music career from Phoenix spring of 2013, Episode was aired on November 27, 2013 for Unsung's 6th season.

Career
He scored an international success in the early 1990s with songs recorded with singer CeCe Peniston, whose initial single "Finally" topped the US Billboard Hot Dance Music/Club Play chart and peaked at number #2 in the UK Top 75, having sold over 3 million copies worldwide. "The composition" earned several music awards, including the Billboard Music Awards, ASCAP Awards, Annual Winter Music Conference Awards and the BMI Urban Award of Achievement. In 2000, Finally was ranked as the 29th out of 100 Greatest Dance Songs of All Time at the VH1's five-part series hosted by Paula Abdul.

Amongst other, he collaborated also with Ice Cube (as a co-producer of the Hardcore's self-titled single "Hardcore/Servin em well", released in 1987) In 1990 he landed a production deal with A&M Records to manage and produce a rapper called Overweight Pooch (whose composition "I Like It" charted at number #16 on the US Dance and #58 on the UK Top 75), contributed to Malaika's singles "So Much Love" (#5 on the US Dance) and "Break It Down", as well as produced several indie records for local Phoenix's artists such as P.D.F. Crew, MC-J Witt, Marvelous JC, MC Leethal, The Weirdoz, LV Sharp, Ditta Don Juan and others.

In 2012 to 2018, Delgado was assistant music director of The Beatlocker Show on KNRJ (101.1 The Beat) in Phoenix Arizona by Founder, Host, and long time friend, Alafia "Pokafase" Long. Delgado responsibilities consisted of, submitting local artist's music, bookings for in studio interviews, Beatlocker Live events, and editing, mastering various artist's music for potential airplay. In 2014 while in Tucson Arizona, Delgado discovered that The Beat's wavelengths reached to Arizona's 2nd largest city, 113 miles southeast of Phoenix, where he submitted various artists of Tucson's best Hip Hop and R&B acts like, The Kennedy's, Swindoe, The Tu, Tora Woloshin, Greedy Green & Cash Lansky to name a few.

Discography
 Production
 Albums

 Singles & EPs

Gallery

See also
List of record producers
List of number-one dance hits (United States)
List of artists who reached number one on the US Dance chart

References

External links
 
 Felipe Delgado on Discogs
 

1969 births
Living people
Musicians from Chicago
Musicians from Phoenix, Arizona
Record producers from Illinois
Songwriters from Illinois
A&M Records artists
Songwriters from Arizona